Peter Eastman (born 1976) is a  South African artist living in Cape Town.

Education

Eastman was born in 1976 and grew up in South Africa. He began his career as an antiquities restorer in London, United Kingdom. He also attended University of Cape Town's Michaelis School of fine art.

Work

In 2014 he began to focus on paintings of pensive and atmospheric forest-scapes,

Eastman is also known for a distinctive monochromatic style. Images held in shallow relief depictions remain nearly invisible until the spectator is positioned correctly for light to throw the images into relief, reflecting changing tone and colour. This technique was probably most successfully used in his monumental “Horse”, 2005.

In 2007, Eastman presented 'Supernature' at Cape Town gallery whatiftheworld. The naturalistic large-scale series of enamel and acrylic paintings on aluminium sheets, depicted the portraits of various owl species relating to themes of superstition and luck.

In 2010, Eastman exhibited a series of black portraits at Primo Marella gallery in Milan, Italy, curated by Yacouba Konaté.

Eastman was selected alongside 17 International artists to produce a poster for The 2010 FIFA World Cup in South Africa. Later that year, the work was auctioned at Phillips de Pury in New York City.

See also

Contemporary African art

Selected solo exhibitions
2019
Tangled Hierarchies, Smac Gallery, Cape Town, South Africa

2017
Coldstream, Smac Gallery, Johannesburg, South Africa

2016
Surface Light, Smac Gallery, Cape Town, South Africa

2014
Deep Chine, Smac Gallery, Cape Town, South Africa

2012
Buried in black and white, Whatiftheworld gallery, Cape Town, South Africa

2010
Life is short, WhatiftheworldIFTHEWORLD gallery, Cape Town, South Africa

2010
For the term of their natural lives, Co-Op gallery, Johannesburg, South Africa

2009
Peter Eastman Landscapes, Aardklop National arts festival, Potchefstroom, South Africa

2008
Shadow Paintings, Obert contemporary, Johannesburg, South Africa

Supernature, Whatiftheworld gallery, Cape Town, South Africa

2007
Black Paintings, Obert Contemporary, Johannesburg, South Africa

2004
Reflective, Stevenson Gallery, Cape Town, South Africa

External links

South African Print gallery
Article in Business Art

References

Living people
South African painters
South African male painters
1976 births